The Wallabrook is a river on Dartmoor, Devon, England.

It is a tributary of the River Tavy. For more details see Walla Brook.

Bibliography
The Painted Stream, Robin Armstrong, Dent, 1985,

See also
Rivers of the United Kingdom

Rivers of Devon
2Wallabrooke